Harmonic bin-packing is a family of online algorithms for bin packing. The input to such an algorithm is a list of items of different sizes. The output is a packing - a partition of the items into bins of fixed capacity, such that the sum of sizes of items in each bin is at most the capacity. Ideally, we would like to use as few bins as possible, but minimizing the number of bins is an NP-hard problem.

The harmonic bin-packing algorithms rely on partitioning the items into categories based on their sizes, following a Harmonic progression. There are several variants of this idea.

Harmonic-k 
An item  is called an -item, if .

A bin of type  is only used for bins to pack items of type . Each bin of type  for  can contain exactly  -items. The algorithm now acts as follows:

 If the next item  is an -item, the algorithm places it into the bins of type  using Next-Fit.

This algorithm was first described by Lee and Lee.  It has a time complexity of  where n is the number of input items. At each step, there are at most  open bins that can be potentially used to place items, i.e., it is a k-bounded space algorithm.

Lee and Lee also studied the asymptotic approximation ratio. For  it holds that . Additionally, they presented a family of worst-case examples for that

Refined-Harmonic (RH) 
The Refined-Harmonic combines ideas from the Harmonic-k algorithm with ideas from Refined-First-Fit. It places the items larger than  similar as in Refined-First-Fit, while the smaller items are placed using Harmonic-k.

There are four possibilities to pack -items and -items into bins.

 An -bin contains only one -item.
 An -bin contains only one -item.
 An -bin contains one -item and one -item.
 An -bin contains two -items.

An -bin denotes a bin that is designated to contain a second -item. The algorithm uses the numbers N_a, N_b, N_ab, N_bb, and N_b' to count the numbers of corresponding bins in the solution. Furthermore, N_c= N_b+N_ab
 Algorithm Refined-Harmonic-k for a list L = (i_1, \dots i_n):
 1. N_a = N_b = N_ab = N_bb = N_b' = N_c = 0
 2. If i_j is an I_k-piece
        then use algorithm Harmonic-k to pack it
 3.     else if i_j is an I_a-item
            then if N_b != 1, 
                then pack i_j into any J_b-bin; N_b--;  N_ab++;
                else place i_j in a new (empty) bin; N_a++;
 4.         else if i_j is an I_b-item
                then if N_b' = 1
                    then place i_j into the I_b'-bin; N_b' = 0; N_bb++;
 5.                 else if N_bb <= 3N_c
                        then place i_j in a new bin and designate it as an I_b'-bin; N_b' = 1
                        else if N_a != 0
                            then place i_j into any I_a-bin; N_a--; N_ab++;N_c++
                            else place i_j in a new bin; N_b++;N_c++
This algorithm was first described by Lee and Lee.  They proved that for  it holds that .

Other variants 
Modified Harmonic (MH) has asymptotic ratio .

Modified Harmonic 2 (MH2) has asymptotic ratio .

Harmonic + 1 (H+1) has asymptotic ratio .

References 

Bin packing